Challwaqucha (Quechua challwa fish, qucha lake, "fish lake", also spelled Chalhuaccocha, Chalhuacocha, Chalhuajocha, Challhuacocha) may refer to:

 Challwaqucha (Ancash), a lake in the Pallasca Province, Ancash Region, Peru
 Challwaqucha (Cajatambo-Oyón), a mountain on the border of the Cajatambo Province and the Oyón Province in the Lima Region, Peru
 Challwaqucha (Cusco), a lake in the Cusco Region, Peru
 Challwaqucha (Huaral), a lake in the Huaral Province, Lima Region, Peru
 Challwaqucha (Huari), a lake in the Huari Province, Ancash Region, Peru
 Challwaqucha (Junín), a lake in the Junín Region, Peru
 Challwaqucha (Yauli), a mountain in the Yauli Province, Junín Region
 Challwaqucha (Yauyos), a lake in the Yauyos Province, Lima Region, Peru